Liam Draxl and Stefan Kozlov were the defending champions but chose not to defend their title.

Yuki Bhambri and Saketh Myneni won the title after defeating Gijs Brouwer and Aidan McHugh 3–6, 6–4, [10–8] in the final.

Seeds

Draw

References

External links
 Main draw

Lexington Challenger - Men's doubles
2022 Men's doubles